Villa Reynolds Airport  is a joint military/general aviation airport serving Villa Mercedes, a city in the San Luis Province of Argentina.

Runway 10/28 is closed. The Villa Reynolds VOR-DME (Ident: RYD) and non-directional beacon (Ident: RYD) are located on the field.

Airlines and destinations

Accidents and incidents
7 August 1971: An Argentine Air Force Douglas C-47A, tail number TC-31, experienced an engine fire during takeoff. The aircraft was written off, but there were no fatalities.

See also

Transport in Argentina
List of airports in Argentina

References

External links
OpenStreetMap - Villa Reynolds Airport
SkyVector - Villa Reynolds Airport

Airports in Argentina